The Orton Park Historic District is located in Madison, Wisconsin. Orton Park, the Bascom B. Clarke House, the Curtis-Kittleson House and the George A. Lougee House are located within the district.

References

Historic districts on the National Register of Historic Places in Wisconsin
National Register of Historic Places in Madison, Wisconsin